Thunder Tiger Corporation is a Taiwan manufacturer of radio controlled models including airplanes, helicopters, cars, boats, accessories and engines. Thunder Tiger is the maker of MT4-G3, Raptor e720, Ghost+ drone, award-winning R/C submarine - Neptune SB-1, and SeaWolf.

History
Thunder Tiger Group was founded in Taichung in 1979. In 1997 it was involved in a takeover of ACE R/C corporation in America. Its 1/8 EB4 car was honored as an Offroad Champion of Europe in 1999. It established a marketing center in Germany for Europe in 2004 and was involved in a takeover of Associated in America in 2005.

In 2012, ThunderTiger set up a new company TTBIO CORP in order to provide the Dental Instruments, accessories,  machining parts, and components to customers.

See also
 List of companies of Taiwan

References

External links

1979 establishments in Taiwan
Radio-controlled car manufacturers
Radio-controlled aircraft
Model manufacturers of Taiwan
Electronics companies established in 1979
Taiwanese brands
Electronics companies of Taiwan